This is a list of feature length animated and live-action theatrical, television, and direct-to-video films based on toys, tabletop games, and trading cards. Many of these films are based on dolls and action figures made by the toy companies Hasbro, Kenner, and Mattel.

Prior to 1977, toys were released together with films as merchandising tie-ins. Films that were suitably toyetic spawned numerous licensed properties, often marketed heavily to children. Beginning in the late 1970s, this approach was flipped as films began to appear that were based on popular toys. In 1977, Raggedy Ann & Andy: A Musical Adventure debuted as the first theatrical motion picture in which a consumer toy was the star. During the 1980s, action figures got their own films, such as Masters of the Universe (The Secret of the Sword) and Transformers (The Transformers: The Movie), as did dolls, such as Pound Puppies (Pound Puppies and the Legend of Big Paw) and My Little Pony (My Little Pony: The Movie). Also in the 1980s, the greeting card companies American Greetings and Hallmark Cards created popular characters that were made into toys, on which films were later based, such as The Care Bears (The Care Bears Movie), Rainbow Brite (Rainbow Brite and the Star Stealer), and Strawberry Shortcake (Strawberry Shortcake: The Sweet Dreams Movie).

A resurgence of live action film adaptions of toy properties began in 2007 with the release of Transformers, the first film in what would become the Transformers film franchise. The first film in the G.I. Joe film franchise, G.I. Joe: The Rise of Cobra, was released two years later. In 2008, Hasbro Inc. entered into a deal with Universal Pictures to make at least four movies based on the toy company's products. In 2012, the poor performance of the first film from this partnership, Battleship, caused other projects in development to be shelved or sold off to other studios. The success of The Lego Movie in 2014 showed that even intellectual properties without an existing narrative, or even familiar characters, could be profitable and its success renewed the interest of toy companies and film studios in producing toy-related projects stuck in development hell. On November 3, 2017, Hasbro Studios entered into a five-year production and distribution deal with Viacom's Paramount Pictures to develop additional stories based on Hasbro properties. Mattel Films has 13 films in production that are based on Mattel toys and games, such as Barbie, Hot Wheels, Magic 8 Ball, Masters of the Universe, Rock 'Em Sock 'Em Robots, Polly Pocket, View-Master, American Girl, and Uno. A live-action film adaptation of Barbie is moving forward with A-list actress (Margot Robbie) and director (Greta Gerwig) after being in development for over a decade.

In addition to films, television series, especially animated cartoon series, have been based on toy properties, often airing at the same time, or soon after, the toys were launched. The extension of toy properties into films and television, as well as video games, books, apparel, and other products marketed to children has allowed companies to build lucrative franchises around their most popular characters and brands.

Live-action films based on toys

 American Girls - Mattel
 Samantha: An American Girl Holiday (2004) - television film
 Felicity: An American Girl Adventure (2005) - television film
 Molly: An American Girl on the Home Front (2006) - television film
 Kit Kittredge: An American Girl (2008)
 An American Girl: Chrissa Stands Strong (2009) - direct-to-video
 An American Girl: McKenna Shoots for the Stars (2012) - direct-to-video
 An American Girl: Saige Paints the Sky (2013) - direct-to-video
 An American Girl: Isabelle Dances Into the Spotlight (2014) - direct-to-video
 An American Girl: Grace Stirs Up Success (2015) - direct-to-video
 An American Girl: Lea to the Rescue (2016) - direct-to-video
 Battleship - Hasbro
 Battleship (2012)
 Bratz - MGA Entertainment
 Bratz: The Movie (2007)
 Barbie - Mattel
 Barbie (2023)
 Barney & Friends - Fisher-Price/Mattel
 Untitled Barney movie (TBA)
 Cluedo (Clue in North America) - Waddingtons/Parker Brothers
 Clue (1985)
 Dungeons & Dragons - TSR/Wizards of the Coast
 Dungeons & Dragons (2000)
 Dungeons & Dragons: Wrath of the Dragon God (2005) - television film
 Dungeons & Dragons: The Book of Vile Darkness (2012) - direct-to-video
 Dungeons & Dragons: Honor Among Thieves (2023)
 Jem and the Holograms - Hasbro 
 Jem and the Holograms (2015)
 Garbage Pail Kids - Topps
 The Garbage Pail Kids Movie (1987)
 G.I. Joe - Hasbro
 G.I. Joe: The Rise of Cobra (2009)
 G.I. Joe: Retaliation (2013)
 The Hugga Bunch - Hallmark Cards/Kenner
 The Hugga Bunch (1985) - television film
 Snake Eyes (2021)
 Mars Attacks - Topps
 Mars Attacks! (1996)
 Masters of the Universe - Mattel
 Masters of the Universe (1987)
 Max Steel - Mattel
 Max Steel (2016)
 My Pet Monster - American Greetings
 My Pet Monster (1986) - direct-to-video
 Ouija - Hasbro
 Ouija (2014)
 Ouija: Origin of Evil (2016)
 Robosapien - WowWee
 Robosapien: Rebooted (2013)
 Transformers - Hasbro
 Transformers (2007)
 Transformers: Revenge of the Fallen (2009)
 Transformers: Dark of the Moon (2011)
 Transformers: Age of Extinction (2014)
 Transformers: The Last Knight (2017)
 Bumblebee (2018)
 Thomas & Friends - Fisher-Price/Mattel
 Thomas & Friends: The Movie (2024)

Animated films based on toys 

 Action Man - Palitoy/Hasbro
 Action Man: Robot Atak (2004) - direct-to-video
 Action Man: X Missions – The Movie (2005) - direct-to-video
 Action Man: The Gangrene Code (2006) - direct-to-video, Mexico only
 Barbie - Mattel
 Barbie and the Rockers: Out of this World (1987) - television film
 Barbie and The Sensations: Rockin' Back to Earth (1987) - television film
 Barbie in the Nutcracker (2001) - direct-to-video
 Barbie as Rapunzel (2002) - direct-to-video
 Barbie of Swan Lake (2003) - direct-to-video
 Barbie as the Princess and the Pauper (2004) - direct-to-video
 Barbie: Fairytopia (2005) - direct-to-video
 Barbie and the Magic of Pegasus (2005) - direct-to-video
 Barbie Fairytopia: Mermaidia (2006) - direct-to-video
 The Barbie Diaries (2006) - direct-to-video
 Barbie in the 12 Dancing Princesses (2006) - direct-to-video
 Barbie Fairytopia: Magic of the Rainbow (2007) - direct-to-video
 Barbie as the Island Princess (2007) - direct-to-video
 Barbie: Mariposa (2008) - direct-to-video
 Barbie and the Diamond Castle (2008) - direct-to-video
 Barbie in a Christmas Carol (2008) - direct-to-video
 Barbie: Thumbelina (2009) - direct-to-video
 Barbie and the Three Musketeers (2009) - direct-to-video
 Barbie in A Mermaid Tale (2010) - direct-to-video
 Barbie: A Fashion Fairytale (2010) - direct-to-video
 Barbie: A Fairy Secret (2011) - direct-to-video
 Barbie: Princess Charm School (2011) - direct-to-video
 Barbie: A Perfect Christmas (2011) - direct-to-video 
 Barbie in A Mermaid Tale 2 (2012) - direct-to-video
 Barbie: The Princess & the Popstar (2012) - direct-to-video
 Barbie in the Pink Shoes (2013) - direct-to-video
 Barbie: Mariposa & the Fairy Princess (2013) - direct-to-video
 Barbie & Her Sisters in A Pony Tale (2013) - direct-to-video
 Barbie: The Pearl Princess (2014) - direct-to-video
 Barbie and the Secret Door (2014) - direct-to-video
 Barbie in Princess Power (2015) - direct-to-video
 Barbie in Rock 'N Royals (2015) - direct-to-video
 Barbie & Her Sisters in The Great Puppy Adventure (2015) - direct-to-video
 Barbie: Spy Squad (2016) - direct-to-video
 Barbie: Star Light Adventure (2016) - direct-to-video
 Barbie & Her Sisters in A Puppy Chase (2016) - direct-to-video
 Barbie: Video Game Hero (2017) - direct-to-video
 Barbie: Dolphin Magic (2017) - direct-to-video
 Bayala - Schleich
 Bayala: A Magical Adventure (2019)
 Bionicle - Lego Group
 Bionicle: Mask of Light (2003) - direct-to-video
 Bionicle 2: Legends of Metru Nui (2004) - direct-to-video
 Bionicle 3: Web of Shadows (2005) - direct-to-video
 Bionicle: The Legend Reborn (2009) - direct-to-video
 BraveStarr - Mattel
 BraveStarr: The Movie (1988) (2004) - direct-to-video
 Bratz - MGA Entertainment
 Bratz: Starrin' & Stylin' (2004)  - direct-to-video
 Bratz: Rock Angelz (2005)  - direct-to-video
 Bratz: Genie Magic (2006)  - direct-to-video
 Bratz: Passion 4 Fashion Diamondz (2006)  - direct-to-video
 Bratz: Fashion Pixiez (2007)  - direct-to-video
 Bratz: Girlz Really Rock (2008)  - direct-to-video
 Bratz: Pampered Petz (2010)  - direct-to-video
 Bratz: Desert Jewelz - Genie Magic 2 (2012)  - direct-to-video
 Bratz Go to Paris: The Movie (2013)  - direct-to-video
 Bratz Babyz - MGA Entertainment
 Bratz Babyz: The Movie (2006) - direct-to-video
 Bratz Super-Babyz (2007) - direct-to-video
 Bratz Babyz Save Christmas (2008) - direct-to-video
 Bratz Kidz - MGA Entertainment
 Bratz Kidz: Sleep-Over Adventure (2007) - direct-to-video
 Bratz Kidz: Fairy Tales (2008) - direct-to-video

 Candy Land - Milton Bradley/Hasbro
 Candy Land: The Great Lollipop Adventure (2005) - direct-to-video
 Care Bears - American Greetings/Kenner
 The Care Bears Movie (1985)
 Care Bears Movie II: A New Generation (1986)
 The Care Bears Adventure in Wonderland (1987)
 Care Bears Nutcracker Suite (1988) - television film
 Care Bears: Journey to Joke-a-lot (2004) - direct-to-video
 The Care Bears' Big Wish Movie (2005) - direct-to-video
 Care Bears: Oopsy Does It! (2007)
 Care Bears: Share Bear Shines (2010) - direct-to-video
 Care Bears: The Giving Festival (2010) - direct-to-video
 Care Bears to the Rescue Movie (2010)
 Care Bears: A Belly Badge for Wonderheart (2013) - direct-to-video
 Enchantimals - Mattel
 Enchantimals: Finding Home (2017)
 Ever After High - Mattel
 Ever After High: Spring Unsprung (2015) - Netflix exclusive
 G.I. Joe - Hasbro
 G.I. Joe: The Movie (1987) - direct-to-video
 G.I. Joe: Spy Troops (2003) - direct-to-video
 G.I. Joe: Valor vs. Venom (2004) - direct-to-video
 Gobots - Tonka/Hasbro
 GoBots: Battle of the Rock Lords (1986)
 Hero Factory - Lego Group
 Hero Factory: Rise of the Rookies (2010) - video release of Hero Factory episodes as a single film
 Hero Factory: Savage Planet (2011) - video release of Hero Factory episodes as a single film
 Herself the Elf - American Greetings/Mattel
 The Special Magic of Herself the Elf (1983) - television film
 Holly Hobby - Tomy/Knickerbocker Toys/American Greetings
 Holly Hobbie and Friends: Surprise Party (2005) - direct-to-video
 Holly Hobbie and Friends: Christmas Wishes (2006) - direct-to-video
 Holly Hobbie and Friends: Secret Adventures (2007) - direct-to-video
 Holly Hobbie and Friends: Best Friends Forever (2007) - direct-to-video
 Holly Hobbie and Friends: Fabulous Fashion Show (2008) - direct-to-video
 Holly Hobbie and Friends: Marvelous Makeover (2009) - direct-to-video
 Hot Wheels - Mattel
 Hot Wheels World Race (2003) - direct-to-video
 Hot Wheels AcceleRacers: Ignition (2005) - direct-to-video
 Hot Wheels AcceleRacers: Speed of Silence (2005) - direct-to-video
 Hot Wheels AcceleRacers: Breaking Point (2005) - direct-to-video
 Hot Wheels AcceleRacers: The Ultimate Race (2005) - direct-to-video
 Team Hot Wheels: The Origin of Awesome! (2014)
  Lego - Lego Group
 Lego: The Adventures of Clutch Powers (2010) - direct-to-video
 The Lego Movie (2014)
 Lego DC Comics Super Heroes: Justice League vs. Bizarro League (2015) - direct-to-video
 Lego DC Comics Super Heroes: Justice League: Attack of the Legion of Doom (2015) - direct-to-video
 Lego DC Comics Super Heroes: Justice League: Cosmic Clash (2016) - direct-to-video
 Lego Scooby-Doo! Haunted Hollywood (2016) - direct-to-video
 Lego DC Comics Super Heroes: Justice League: Gotham City Breakout (2016) - direct-to-video
 The Lego Batman Movie (2017)
 The Lego Ninjago Movie (2017)
 The Lego Movie 2: The Second Part (2019)
 Lionel toy trains and model railroads - Lionel
 Lionel Lionelville Destination: Adventure (2009) - direct-to-video
 Masters of the Universe - Mattel
 The Secret of the Sword (1985)
 Max Steel - Mattel
 Max Steel: Endangered Species (2004) - direct-to-video
 Max Steel: Forces of Nature (2005) - direct-to-video
 Max Steel: Countdown (2006) - direct-to-video
 Max Steel: Dark Rival (2007) - direct-to-video
 Max Steel: Bio Crisis (2008) - direct-to-video
 Max Steel vs. The Mutant Menace (2009) - direct-to-video
 Max Steel vs. The Toxic Legion (2010) - direct-to-video
 Mega Bloks - Mega Brands
 Dragons: Fire and Ice (2004) - direct-to-video
 Dragons II: The Metal Ages (2005) - television film
Mini 4WD - Tamiya 
Bakusō Kyōdai Let's & Go!! WGP: Bousou Mini 4WD Daitsuiseki (1997)
 Monster High - Mattel
 Monster High: Ghouls Rule (2012) - television film
 Monster High: 13 Wishes (2013) - television film
 Monster High: Frights, Camera, Action! (2014) - television film
 Monster High: Freaky Fusion (2014) - television film
 Monster High: Haunted (2015) - television film
 Monster High: Boo York, Boo York (2015) - direct-to-video
 Monster High: Great Scarrier Reef (2016) - direct-to-video
 Welcome to Monster High (2016)
 Monster High: Electrified (2017) - direct-to-video
 Monster High: Happy Howlidays, Ghouls (2017) - direct-to-video
 My Little Pony - Hasbro
My Little Pony: The Movie (1986)
 My Little Pony: A Very Minty Christmas (2005) - direct-to-video
 My Little Pony: The Princess Promenade (2006) - direct-to-video
 My Little Pony Crystal Princess: The Runaway Rainbow (2006) - direct-to-video
 My Little Pony: A Very Pony Place (2007) - direct-to-video
 My Little Pony: Twinkle Wish Adventure (2009) - direct-to-video
 My Little Pony: Equestria Girls (2013)
 My Little Pony: Equestria Girls – Rainbow Rocks (2014)
 My Little Pony: Equestria Girls – Friendship Games (2015)
 My Little Pony: Equestria Girls – Legend of Everfree (2016)
My Little Pony: The Movie (2017)
My Little Pony: A New Generation (September 24, 2021) - Netflix exclusive
 My Scene - Mattel
 My Scene Goes Hollywood (2005) - direct-to-video
 Playmobil - Brandstätter Group
 Playmobil: The Secret of Pirate Island (2009) - direct-to-video
 Playmobil: The Movie (2019)
 Polly Pocket - Bluebird Toys/Mattel
 PollyWorld (2006) - direct-to-video
 Pound Puppies - Tonka/Hasbro
 The Pound Puppies (1985) - television film
 Pound Puppies and the Legend of Big Paw (1988)
 Princess of Power - Mattel
 The Secret of the Sword (1985)
 Raggedy Ann & Andy - Hasbro (since 1983)
 Raggedy Ann & Andy: A Musical Adventure (1977)
 Rainbow Brite - Hallmark Cards/Mattel
 Rainbow Brite and the Star Stealer (1985)
 Rescue Heroes - Fisher-Price
 Rescue Heroes: The Movie (2003) - direct-to-video
 Robotix - Milton Bradley/Hasbro
 Robotix: The Movie (1987) - televised shorts released as direct-to-video feature

 Shopkins - Moose Toys
 Shopkins: Chef Club (2016) - direct-to-video
 Shopkins: World Vacation (2017) - direct-to-video
 Shopkins: Wild (2018) - direct-to-video
 Star Fairies - Tonka/Hasbro
 Star Fairies (1985) - television film
 Strawberry Shortcake - American Greetings/Kenner/Playmates Toys/Hasbro
 Strawberry Shortcake: The Sweet Dreams Movie (2006)
 Strawberry Shortcake: Berry Blossom Festival (2007) - theatrically released episodes of Strawberry Shortcake
 Strawberry Shortcake: Let's Dance (2007) - theatrically released episodes of Strawberry Shortcake
 Strawberry Shortcake: Rockaberry Roll (2008) - theatrically released episodes of Strawberry Shortcake
 The Strawberry Shortcake Movie: Sky's the Limit (2009) - direct-to-video
 Strawberry Shortcake: The Glimmerberry Ball Movie (2010) - direct-to-video
 Tonka Trucks - Tonka/Hasbro
 Tonka Tough Truck Adventures: The Biggest Show on Wheels (2004) - direct-to-video
 Transformers - Hasbro
 The Transformers: The Movie (1986)
 Transformers Prime Beast Hunters: Predacons Rising (2013) - television film
 Troll doll - Dam Things/DreamWorks Animation
 Trolls (2016)
 Trolls World Tour (2020)
 Uglydoll - Pretty Ugly/STX Entertainment
 UglyDolls (2019)
 Various classic toys in Pixar's Toy Story films
 Toy Story (1995)
 Toy Story 2 (1999)
 Toy Story 3 (2010)
 Toy Story 4 (2019)

References

See also

 American Girl (film series)
 Barbie (film series)
 G.I. Joe (film series)
 List of Lego films
 My Little Pony: Equestria Girls (franchise)
 Transformers (film series)
 List of films based on Hasbro properties
 List of television programs based on Hasbro properties
 List of films based on comic strips
 List of films based on comics
 List of films based on video games

Toys